is wagyū (Japanese beef) originating in the Yonezawa region of Yamagata Prefecture, Japan. Within Japan, Yonezawa is considered one of the generally recognized three most famous beef brands in Japan, along with Kobe beef and Matsusaka beef.

References

External links

 Official website 

Beef
Japanese cuisine